Joseph Olshan is an American novelist.

Life and career
Olshan is the author of ten novels, most recently, Black Diamond Fall (Polis Books, 2018). His first novel, Clara's Heart, won the Times/Jonathan Cape Young Writers' Competition and went on to be made into a feature film starring Whoopi Goldberg in 1988. In addition to his novels, he has written extensively for newspapers and magazines, including the San Francisco Chronicle The New York Times, The New York Times Magazine, The Times, The Observer, The Independent, The Washington Post, The Chicago Tribune, The New York Observer, Harper's Bazaar, People Magazine, and Entertainment Weekly. Between 1992 and 1994 he was a regular book reviewer for The Wall Street Journal. For most of the 1990s he was a professor of Creative Writing at New York University, where he taught both graduate and undergraduate courses. He is currently Editorial Director of Delphinium Books (distributed by Harpercollins).<ref>{{cite web|author=Joseph Olshan |url=http://us.macmillan.com/theconversion#biography |title=MacMillan - St. Martin's Press > Joseph Olshan Author Page > The Conversion |publisher=Us.macmillan.com |date= |accessdate=2013-12-05}}</ref>

Olshan is published in the U.S. by St. Martin's Press and Berkley Books and in United Kingdom by Bloomsbury Publishing and by Arcadia Books.  His work has been translated into sixteen languages. He grew up in Harrison, New York, and New York City and graduated from the University of California at Santa Barbara. He lives in Bend, Oregon, and Stamford, Connecticut.

Olshan is openly gay. He is not considered a writer of gay literature but prefers to be considered simply as a "writer".

 Novels 
 Black Diamond Fall (Polis Books, 2018)
 Cloudland (St. Martin's Press, 2012)
 The Conversion (St. Martin's Press, 2008)
 In Clara's Hands (Bloomsbury, 2003)
 Vanitas (Simon & Schuster, 1998)
 Nightswimmer (Simon & Schuster, 1994)
 The Sound of Heaven (Bloomsbury, 1992)
 The Waterline (Doubleday, 1989)
 A Warmer Season (Bloomsbury/McGraw-Hill, co-pub, 1987)
 Clara's Heart'' (Arbor House, 1985)

References

Sources 
 Library of Congress Online Catalog > Joseph Olshan

External links
 Joseph Olshan Official Website
 Audio: Vermont Public Radio > Interview with Author Joseph Olshan on The Conversion > Friday May 2, 2008 > By Neal Charnoff
 Bloomsbury > Joseph Olshan Bio
 Audio: NPR's All Things Considered> Book reviewer Alan Cheuse Examines The Conversion, by Joseph Olshan
 Audio: NPR's All Things Considered> Book reviewer Alan Cheuse Reviews Vanitas, by Joseph Olshan
 Review: Library Journal > Review by Jenn B. Stidham of The Conversion by Joseph Olshan

Living people
Year of birth missing (living people)
20th-century American novelists
21st-century American novelists
American male novelists
American gay writers
Novelists from Vermont
People from Windsor County, Vermont
People from Harrison, New York
American LGBT novelists
The Wall Street Journal people
University of California, Santa Barbara alumni
New York University faculty
LGBT people from New York (state)
LGBT people from Vermont
20th-century American male writers
21st-century American male writers
Novelists from New York (state)
20th-century American non-fiction writers
21st-century American non-fiction writers
American male non-fiction writers